Mitko Khadzhiev (born 24 February 1961) is a Bulgarian former alpine skier who competed in the 1980 Winter Olympics and 1984 Winter Olympics.

External links
 sports-reference.com
 

1961 births
Living people
Bulgarian male alpine skiers
Olympic alpine skiers of Bulgaria
Alpine skiers at the 1980 Winter Olympics
Alpine skiers at the 1984 Winter Olympics
Place of birth missing (living people)